The Austrian Ski Association (Österreichischer Skiverband, abbrev. ÖSV ), is the winter sports federation for Austria. Part of the International Ski Federation (FIS), it deals with some federations conducting sports for the Winter Olympics, including skiing, biathlon and ski jumping.

The successes

Alpine skiing
Austrian alpine skiers won 34 overall FIS Alpine Ski World Cup, 17 with men and 17 with women and won 926 races.

Ski jumping
The Austrian ski jumpers won 7 gold medals at the Winter Olympics, the Austria team is third in the all-time medal table.

The scandals

The abuses (2017)
In 2017 the former alpine skier Nicola Spiess-Werdenigg reported serious cases of sexual abuse in the ÖSV in the 1970s.

Toni Sailer (2018)
After his death, the former Austrian ski legend Toni Sailer, formerly an official of the ÖSV, was accused of having been used for the consumption of alcohol and to this came the accusations of sexual violence against a woman for facts that occurred in the 1970s.

Doping (2019)
On 27 February 2019 it was announced that the two Austrian cross-country skiers Dominik Baldauf and Max Hauke were arrested following an anti-doping raid.

Sports 
 Alpine skiing
 Cross-country skiing
 Nordic Combined
 Ski jumping
 Biathlon 
 Snowboarding
 Ski cross
 Freestyle skiing

See also
 Austria national alpine ski team
 Austrian Alpine Ski Championships

References

External links
 

Austria
Winter
Austria
Skiing in Austria
Sports organizations established in 1905